This is a list of melon dishes and foods that use melon as a primary ingredient. A melon is any of various plants of the family Cucurbitaceae with edible, fleshy fruit. The word "melon" can refer to either the plant or specifically to the fruit.

Melon dishes and foods

 Bogobe jwa lerotse – porridge prepared using the lerotse melon
 Egusi – fat- and protein-rich seeds of certain cucurbitaceous (melon, squash, gourd) plants. Egusi soup is thickened with egusi. Egusi sauce is prepared using egusi.
Gelu di Muluni – Sicilian dessert of ground watermelon flesh cooked with starch and sugar then cooled to solidify, topped with jasmine, candied fruit bits, pistachios and cinnamon. 
 Gōyā chanpurū – type of chanpurū that is a popular and widely recognized dish in the Okinawan cuisine of the island of Okinawa, Japan. It is a stir fry of bitter melon, tofu, egg and sliced pork or Spam.
 Melon ball – balls of melon made using a melon baller
 Melon soup – soup prepared with melon as a primary ingredient
 Pinakbet – usually includes bitter melon, and is an indigenous Filipino dish from the northern regions of the Philippines. Pinakbet is made from mixed vegetables steamed in fish or shrimp sauce.
 Stuffed melon – Turkish dish made of melon stuffed with meat (lamb) and rice.
 Subak hwachae – variety of hwachae, or Korean traditional fruit punch, made with watermelon
 Sweetheart cake – traditional Cantonese pastry with a thin crust of flaky pastry, and made with a filling of winter melon, almond paste, and sesame, and spiced with five spice powder.
 Watermelon rind preserves – made by boiling chunks of watermelon rind with sugar and other ingredients
 Watermelon seed oil – extracted by pressing from the seeds of watermelon
 Watermelon steak – steak-shaped pieces of watermelon, often prepared by grilling
 Xi gua lao – watermelon jelly, a traditional dish of Beijing cuisine

Beverages

 Melon soda 
 Midori – a liqueur prepared using muskmelon

See also
 List of fruit dishes
 List of melons

References

Melon dishes